William Wills may refer to:

 William Wills, 1st Baron Winterstoke (1830–1911), British businessman and peer
 William Gorman Wills (1828–1891), Irish dramatist and painter
 William Henry Wills (journalist) (1810–1880), journalist, newspaper editor and friend of Charles Dickens
 William Henry Wills (politician) (1882–1946), American politician and governor of Vermont
 William John Wills (1834–1861), English explorer and second-in-command of the Burke and Wills expedition
 William Day Wills (1791–1865), British tobacco merchant
 William Ridley Wills (Insurance executive) (1871–1949) Founder, National Life and Accident Insurance Co.
 William Ridley Wills (1897–1957), American novelist, poet, and journalist
 Ridley Wills II  (born 1934) Full name: William Ridley Wills II – American businessman, author, historian
 William S. S. Willes (1819–1871), Mormon pioneer